Pristimantis tubernasus is a species of frog in the family Strabomantidae.

It is found in Colombia and Venezuela. Its natural habitat is tropical moist montane forests. It is threatened by habitat loss.

References

tubernasus
Amphibians of Colombia
Amphibians of Venezuela
Amphibians described in 1984
Taxonomy articles created by Polbot